Edward Harley, 3rd Earl of Oxford and Earl Mortimer ( – 11 April 1755) was a British peer and Member of Parliament. He was the nephew of Britain's First Minister between 1710 and 1714 Robert Harley.

Early life
Harley was the son and heir of Sarah Foley (the third daughter of Thomas Foley of Witley Court) and Edward Harley of Eywood, the Auditor of the Imprest and the next younger brother of Robert Harley, 1st Earl of Oxford and Earl Mortimer.

Harley was educated at Westminster School and Christ Church, Oxford.

Career

He was returned to Parliament as the member for Herefordshire in 1727, sitting until 1741. He was known as a Hanoverian Tory. He vigorously defended the past record of his uncle Robert's governments during Queen Anne's reign.

He succeeded his father in 1735 to the Eywood estate at Titley, Herefordshire and his cousin Edward Harley, 2nd Earl of Oxford and Earl Mortimer in 1741 to the earldom and the family seat, Brampton Bryan Hall at Brampton Bryan in Herefordshire.

One of his first acts on succeeding his cousin was to auction off his predecessor's art and coin collection through the auctioneer Cock, at an art sale held under the Piazza, Covent Garden, on 8 March 1741/2 and the five following days, with six more days being required by the coins. Nearly all the leading men of the day, including Horace Walpole, attended or were represented at this sale, and the prices varied from five shillings for an anonymous bishop's "head" to 165 guineas for van Dyck's group of "Sir Kenelm Digby, lady, and son".

Personal life
On 16 March 1724 or 1725, at St. Anne's Church, Soho, he married Martha Morgan, a daughter of Sir John Morgan of Tredegar and Martha Vaughan (a daughter and co-heiress of Gwyn Vaughan of Trebarried) and the sister of Sir William Morgan and Sir Thomas Morgan.  They had several children:

 Edward Harley, 4th Earl of Oxford (1726–1790), also an MP for Hertfordshire; he married heiress Susannah Archer, a daughter of William Archer.
 Hon. John Harley (1728–1788), the Bishop of Hereford who married his cousin Roach Vaughan, daughter of Gwynne Vaughan of Trebarried; their son, Edward became 5th Earl of Oxford.
 Hon. Thomas Harley (1730–1804), Lord Mayor of London who married Anne Bangham, the daughter of Edward Bangham, MP for Leominster.
 Rev. Hon. William Harley (d. 1769).
 Lady Sarah Harvey (d. 1737).
 Lady Martha Harvey, who married Charles Milborne, of The Priory, Abergavenny, in 1764.

Lord Oxford died on 11 April 1755 and was succeeded in his titles by his eldest son Edward.

References

1690s births
1755 deaths
People educated at Westminster School, London
Alumni of Christ Church, Oxford
Earls in the Peerage of Great Britain
Harley, Edward
British MPs 1727–1734
British MPs 1734–1741
Edward